Moraine Township is a township in Lake County, Illinois, USA.  As of the 2010 census, its population was 34,129. Moraine Township was originally called Deerfield Township, but the name was changed on October 29, 1998.

Geography

Cities and towns
 Deerfield (east edge)
 Highland Park (northeast three-quarters)
 Highwood
 Lake Forest (southeast edge)

Adjacent townships
 New Trier Township, Cook County (southeast)
 Northfield Township, Cook County (south)
 West Deerfield Township (west)
 Shields Township (northwest)

Cemeteries
The township contains four cemeteries: Daggitt, Fort Sheridan, Mooney, and Saint Marys.

Major highways
 U.S. Route 41

Airports and landing strips
 Gieser Heliport

Demographics

References
 U.S. Board on Geographic Names (GNIS)
 United States Census Bureau cartographic boundary files

External links
 Moraine Township official website
 US-Counties.com
 City-Data.com
 US Census
 Illinois State Archives

Townships in Lake County, Illinois
Townships in Illinois